is a shōjo manga by Chieko Hosokawa. It has run in the monthly magazine Princess since 1976. In 1991, it received the 36th Shogakukan Manga Award for shōjo. As of 2015, the collected volumes had sold 40 million copies in Japan, making it the fourth best-selling shōjo manga ever. With 68 volumes (as of January 2023), it is one of the longest-running manga series of all time. The manga has been adapted into 2 anime drama CD's released in 1990 by Pony Canyon (reprinted in 2004) and an anime OVA produced by Toei Animation. It was adapted into a stage musical in 2016.

Story 
The main character, Carol, is a blonde-haired, blue-eyed American teenager from a wealthy family who has an interest in Egyptology and is studying in Cairo. When her mentor discovers the tomb of a young pharaoh, a curse is put on the excavation team and Carol. The curse sends her back in time to ancient Egypt, where she becomes embroiled in the affairs of Egypt and other ancient countries such as Assyria and Babylonia. Carol meets Memphis, a handsome young pharaoh whose tomb she excavated in modern times. Despite his headstrong, at first violent nature, they fall deeply in love. This angers Memphis's half-sister, the Priestess Isis, who has longed to marry him. Carol, due to her exotic looks and curious ability to tell the future, becomes a major player in ancient history.

Characters

Main Characters 
 
Voiced by Keiko Han (OVA)/ Miyuki Sawashiro (Drama CD)
The heroine of the story—a blonde-haired, blue-eyed American teenager who studies archaeology in Cairo. When she got cursed, she was sent back 3000 years ago and meets the cruel but handsome Pharaoh, Memphis. Due to her vast knowledge of ancient Egyptian history, Carol is able to help Egypt through difficulties and because of that, the people of Egypt hail her as the Daughter of the Nile, Guardian of Egypt. Due to her beauty and intelligence, Carol is constantly surrounded by danger in the ancient world, since people either want to kill her or keep her for themselves.

 
Voiced by Akira Kamiya (OVA)/ Yūki Kaji (Drama CD)
The 17-year-old pharaoh of the ancient Egypt 3000 years ago. At first, Memphis is shown as a cruel and spoiled Pharaoh, but later, we see his softer side as he develops feelings towards Carol. His name is based on the ancient capital of the Egyptian Empire, Memphis.

 
Voiced by Kazuko Sugiyama (OVA)/ Romi Park (Drama CD)
The Princess and High Priestess of ancient Egypt (she rules Lower Egypt) and elder sister of Memphis. She is madly in love with her brother and wants to kill Carol to take her place as Egyptian Queen (by her brother's side), believing that she will make Egypt stronger and more prosperous. Isis hides her cruelty and hatred of Carol behind her beauty and is always plotting to kill Carol in numerous ways. Her name is based on the Egyptian goddess Isis.

Supporting Characters

Modern Days 
 : eldest brother of Carol. He cares about her more than anything. Ryan is depicted as a clever young man and he manages his father's company after his death.

 : second eldest brother of Carol.

 : father of Carol. He died from being bitten by a cobra controlled by Isis, because he broke into the Royal Grave.

 : mother of Carol. She loves her much and always has her best interests at heart.
 : the old joyful nanny of Carol.
 : grandfather of Jimmy Brown, he wants to take Carol as his granddaughter-in-law. A brilliant archaeologist who found the tomb of Memphis with Carol and her friends.

 : A childhood friend of Carol. He is in love with  her and wants to marry her.

 : the young son of an Arabian oil tycoon.

Ancient World

Kingdom of Egypt
 : the deceased father of Memphis and Isis. He was named after the historical Nefermaat.
 : the second wife of King Nefermaat, formerly a Princess of Nubia. She murdered her husband, attempting to marry his son. She failed to do so.
 : the prime minister of Egypt with a bright and calm personality. He was named after Imhotep.

 : a general of Egypt, he is loyal to Memphis and in love with Isis.

 : a female official. She is the mother of Minue.

 : personal guard of Memphis and later Carol. Born into slavery, young Memphis took him into his service on a whim while the prince was still a little boy rampaging outside of imperial palace.

 : a loyal servant of Prince Ismir who is sent- undercover- to Egypt to protect Carol, and to bring Carol to Ismir whenever possible. He and Carol form a close friendship.

 : the philogynist priest of Egypt. He harbours less than pure interest in Carol. He is obsessed with gold, and a golden-haired goddess would be his most valuable piece of collection.

 : a loyal confidant of queen Carol.

 : a young merchant traveling across deserts. He is also a doctor. He helps his uncle Careb to kidnap Carol from Hittite to Assyria.

 : an old greedy merchant.

 : confident of princess Isis.

 : the imposter prince of Egypt. Using the items of a secret grave of a daughter of King Nefermaat in the desert, he counterfeits the evidence to become a royal.

 : the former jail-mate of Nebamen.

 : an ambitious woman sent to the Egyptian palace by Kapta as a palace maid.

Kingdom of the Hittites
 : a cruel and perverted king. He is philogynist.

 : Ismir and Mitamun's mother.

 
Voiced by Kaneto Shiozawa / Takahiro Sakurai
The young, handsome crown prince of the Hittites (present day Turkey). He distinguishes himself in the story as a valiant warrior, and at the same time, a wise, intelligent, cunning strategist of the Hittite army. Believing that Memphis killed his beloved younger sister Mitamun, he decides to disguise himself as a Palestinian merchant and secretly enters Egypt. There he falls in love with Carol at first sight. Besides Memphis, no one else in the story loves Carol as much as Ismir does.

 : the younger sister of Ismir. She fell in love with Memphis, who seemed to also be interested in her. Isis imprisoned and killed her by jealousy.

 : the nanny of prince Ismir. She has a close relationship with the prince and seems to love him as her own son.

 : Ismir's cousin.

 : the princess and younger sister of the King. She is Gidantash's mother.

 : the fiancée of prince Ismir.

 : a military leader of the Hittites.

Empire of Assyria
 
Voiced by Seizō Katō
The sly emperor of Assyria who is known to use dirty tactics and lowly tricks. He longs for Carol, the Daughter of the Nile river, who is well known for her beauty, intelligence and her position as the future queen of Egypt. Aside from wanting Carol for her beauty and intelligence, he plans to use her to conquer Egypt.

 : Algon's favorite concubine. She travels to Egypt and follows her emperor's order to seduce Memphis.

 : the brother of emperor Algon.

Empire of Babylonia
 : the emperor of Babylonia. He proposed to Isis and made her his bride with the condition "Kill Carol". Ragashu breaks his promise to Isis and instead of killing Carol, he imprisons her in the Tower of Babel.

 : the confident of emperor Ragash.

 : an official and the high priest of Babylonia.

 : the son of high priest Rimusin.

Kingdom of Minoa
 : the king of Minoa. He has a weak health before Carol goes to Minoa and makes him healthier. Minos then falls in love with Carol. He is possibly named after Minos, the king of Crete from Greek Mythology.

 : the prince of Minoa and elder brother of Minos. Because of his strange appearance, his mother hid him in a deep cave of the Empire. She usually visits him and tells him what happens in the Empire. His name and appearance are based on the Greek Titan Atlas and the ox-like creature Minotaurus.

 : the mother of king Minos and Atlas. She is also the bright regent who helps her son rule over Minoa.

 : the general of Minoa. A powerful warrior.

 : daughter of an official. She is one of the royal handmaidens in Minos' palace.

 : a noble lady from Athens who became a handmaiden to the Minoans.

 : a witch who helps Prince Ismir take princess Carol into his custody. Her name and character are loosely based on Circe from Greek mythology.

Other factions
The Amazones
 : the beautiful queen of the Amazones. She adores Carol. She kidnaps prince Ismir to save her sister, whose life in turn is saved by Carol.

 : sister of the queen.

Kingdom of Libya
 : father of princess Kafra.
 : the princess of Libya. She fell for Memphis and set many traps to eliminate Carol. She is proud of her dark-skinned and plump-faced beauty.

Empire of the Abyssinians
 : the blue prince of the empire. He was imprisoned by Memphis's soldier and punished heavily by Memphis by mistake.

 : the maid serving prince Massharhiqhi.

Media Kingdom
 : The King of Media. He hid his true identity to know more about the Egyptian palace's situation. He gave Carol a rare Chinese silk.

Kingdom of Indus
 : prince of the Ancient Indus.

References

External links
 

1976 manga
1988 anime OVAs
Egyptian mythology in anime and manga
Winners of the Shogakukan Manga Award for shōjo manga
Shōjo manga
Akita Shoten manga
Comics about time travel